Pseudopaulia is a genus of lichenized fungi within the family Lichinaceae. This is a monotypic genus, containing the single species Pseudopaulia tessellata.

References

External links
Index Fungorum

Lichinomycetes
Lichen genera
Monotypic Ascomycota genera
Taxa described in 2002